Edward "Peter" Mooney (born 22 March 1897) was an English professional footballer who played as a right half.

Career
Born in Newcastle upon Tyne, Mooney played for Newcastle United, making over 120 appearances in the Football League.

References

1897 births
Year of death missing
English footballers
Newcastle United F.C. players
English Football League players
Association football wing halves
FA Cup Final players